BDL Bipolar is the debut album by British rapper Big Narstie, released on 6 July 2018 on Dice Recordings. The album's title is a reference to Narstie's collective the Base Defence League.

Critical reception

The album received mixed reviews from critics. Rachel Aroesti of The Guardian criticised the long running time of the album and the "largely incoherent comedy skits". She said that Narstie seemed "stuck in the past" and "often seems stretched thin, resorting to lazy punning", concluding, "It all adds up to a baggy and frequently baffling record". Alex McFadyen of Clash was more positive, calling Narstie "one of grime's most introspective MCs" and stated, "there are moments on this record where he discusses emotions in a way that is rare amid the hype and excitement of so much grime, and indeed, masculine culture at large", and that "while the juxtaposition of staid instrumentals with subversive lyrics is jarring, he remains a gifted MC, worth hearing out".

Track listing

References

2018 debut albums
Hip hop albums by English artists